Yonglong may refer to:

Locations
Yonglong Shoal, or Yonglongsha (Chinese: 永隆沙), former island in Yangtze River above Chongming Island in China
Yonglong, a town in Jingshan County, Jingmen, Hubei, China

Historical eras
Yonglong (永隆, 618–628), era name used by Liang Shidu
Yonglong (永隆, 680–681), era name used by Emperor Gaozong of Tang
Yonglong (永隆, 939–943), era name used by Wang Yanxi, emperor of Min